Paul-Henri Besson (4 April 1848 Nods, Switzerland - 30 December 1932 Buenos Aires, Argentina) was a Swiss Baptist missionary, biblical scholar, linguist, writer and historian. Paul Besson is considered the initiator of the Evangelical Baptist Convention of Argentina. He is known for his translation of the New Testament, the first in all of Latin America, from koine Greek into Spanish. Besson was recognized by the entire Argentine Protestant movement.

Education 
He studied at the Faculty of Theology at the University of Neuchâtel (1868). He returned to study at the University of Basel, to finish his degree in theology.

Bibliography

References

Sources 

1848 births
1932 deaths
Evangelicalism in Argentina
Translators of the Bible into Spanish
University of Neuchâtel alumni
University of Basel alumni
Swiss evangelicals